Francesco Filippo "Frank" Bizzoni (May 7, 1875 – December 25, 1926) was an Italian track cyclist who competed in the St Louis 1904 Summer Olympics. He was born in Lodi, Lombardy and died in the Bronx, New York.

In 1904 he was eliminated in the semi-final of the quarter mile competition. Bizzoni is the only known Italian competitor at the St. Louis Games in 1904. In all records he is listed as an American cyclist. However, he was granted US citizenship only in 1917.

References

External links
 "Italy Has Competed at All Olympic Games"

1875 births
1926 deaths
Italian male cyclists
American male cyclists
Olympic cyclists of the United States
Cyclists at the 1904 Summer Olympics
People from Lodi, Lombardy
Cyclists from the Province of Lodi
Italian emigrants to the United States